An open-source video game, or simply an open-source game, is a video game whose source code is open-source. They are often freely distributable and sometimes cross-platform compatible.

Definition and differentiation 
Not all open-source games are free software; some open-source games contain proprietary non-free content. Open-source games that are free software and contain exclusively free content conform to DFSG, free culture, and open content and are sometimes called free games. Many Linux distributions require for inclusion that the game content is freely redistributable, freeware or commercial restriction clauses are prohibited.

Background

In general, open-source games are developed by relatively small groups of people in their free time, with profit not being the main focus. Many open-source games are volunteer-run projects, and as such, developers of free games are often hobbyists and enthusiasts. The consequence of this is that open-source games often take longer to mature, are less common and often lack the production value of commercial titles. In the past (before the 2000s) a challenge to build high-quality content for games was the missing availability or the excessive price for tools like 3D modeller or toolsets for level design.

In recent years, this changed and availability of open-source tools like Blender, game engines and libraries drove open source and independent video gaming. FLOSS game engines, like the Godot game engine, as well as libraries, like SDL, are increasingly common in game development, even proprietary ones. Given that game art is not considered software, there is debate about the philosophical or ethical obstacles in selling a game where its art is proprietary but the entire source code is free software.

Some of the open-source game projects are based on formerly proprietary games, whose source code was released as open-source software, while the game content (such as graphics, audio and levels) may or may not be under a free license. Examples include Warzone 2100 (a real-time strategy game) and Micropolis (a city-building simulator based on the SimCity source code). Advantage of such continuation projects is that these games are already "complete" as graphic and audio content is available, and therefore the open-source authors can focus on porting, fixing bugs or modding the games.

In a 2004 article, Adam Geitgey questioned the compatibility of the open-source culture with respect to the game development process. He suggested that perceived open-source development advantages do not work for games because users move on to new games relatively quickly and so do not give back to the project. Geitgey further noted that music and art development is not built up from the work of others in the same way that coding would be. He argued that high quality art content is required, which is typically produced commercially by paid artists. While Linux operates on the open-source philosophy, this may not benefit game development.

As of September 2015, the Steam gaming service has 1,500 games available on Linux, compared to 2,323 games for Mac and 6,500 Windows games.

History

Beginnings and early games

Just as in most other forms of software, free software was an unconscious occurrence during the creation of early computer games, particularly for earlier Unix games. These are mostly arcade conversions, parlour games, and text adventures using libraries like curses. A notable example of this is the "BSD Games", a collection of interactive fiction and other text-mode titles. Game fan communities such as the modding community do include some aspects of free software, such as sharing mods across community sites, sometimes with free to use media made for the modification.

With the rise of proprietary software in the mid to late 1980s, games became more and more proprietary. However, this also led to the first deliberately free games such as GNU Backgammon, GNU Chess, GNU Go, and GNU Shogi of the GNU Project established in 1983, part of whose goal is to create a complete free software system, games included. More advanced free gaming projects emerged, such as Moria and its descendent Angband, Hack and its derivatives NetHack and Slash'EM, in addition to Xtrek successor  Netrek, variants of robots, and adventure game Dunnet, which has been included with GNU Emacs since 1994 among others. Still developed and played today, front-ends for frameworks such as X11, SDL, GTK and Qt, plus fuller featured variants such as Iso-Angband, glHack and Vulture's Eye have kept the games accessible. Roguelikes have continued to be produced, including Cataclysm: Dark Days Ahead, Tales of Maj'Eyal, HyperRogue, DRL, Isleward, Egoboo, S.C.O.U.R.G.E., Shattered Pixel Dungeon, as well as Linley's Dungeon Crawl and its offspring Dungeon Crawl Stone Soup. The source code to the original Rogue was released under the BSD license in 1986.

As PC gaming began to emerge in the late 1980s and early 1990s, free gaming also advanced. More complicated games utilizing the X Window System for graphics started to appear, most beginning with the signature letter X. These included XAsteroids, XBattle, XBoing, X-Bomber, XConq, XDigger, XEmeraldia, XGalaga, XGammon, XLander, XLife, XMahjong, XMine, XSoldier, XPilot, XRobots, XRubiks, XShogi, XScavenger, XTris, XTron, and XTic. XBill is notable as one of the earliest free gaming titles to feature an activist theme of halting proprietary software adoption, later echoed in titles such as Virus Killer, Defendguin and FreedroidRPG. XEvil followed the development cycle of many early pieces of free software, having originally been developed as a university project on the Project Athena network, although it was freeware for a while. The game was also one of the first free titles to feature controversial subject matter such as graphic violence and drug use. XTux was also an early deathmatch game for Linux, featuring various free software mascots, a theme that would continue to be revisited. Rocks'n'Diamonds is another earlier free software game, and one of the first for Linux.

The Freeciv project was started in 1995 and gave rise to another new style of free game development. Similar to the cooperative nature of the Linux kernel development, Freeciv was extended by many volunteers, rather than only one or two authors. It had started out as a small university student project but then branched out into its current form and is still being developed today. Freeciv also proved to be one of the earliest very popular free software games, and was among the first to be included with Linux distributions, a system commonly known now as a source of peer review or selection of quality for free gaming projects. Magazines, news sources and websites have also started noting free games, often in listings. Freeciv and other archetypes have led to the development of many other clones of popular proprietary games. Lincity was also started in 1995, despite there having been a Unix version of its namesake officially released by DUX Software in 1990.

Beyond directly tying to the operating system, various free game development frameworks emerged starting with Allegro in 1990, SDL in 1998, ClanLib in 1999, OpenAL in 2000, SFML in 2007, as well as SDL 2 and Raylib in 2013. The GNU Image Manipulation Program, MyPaint, Kirta, Inkscape, Synfig, Pencil2D, Audacity, Rosegarden, OpenShot, Kdenlive, Pitivi, Blender, MakeHuman, MM3D, and other applications have provided an entire open source toolchain for creative projects.

3D games and source releases 

Proprietary games such as Doom and Descent brought in the age of three-dimensional games in the early to mid 1990s, and free games started to make the switch themselves. Tuxedo T. Penguin: A Quest for Herring by Steve Baker, a game featuring the Linux mascot Tux and introducing the PLIB library, was an early example of a three-dimensional free software game. He and his son Oliver would later create other popular 3D free games and clones such as TuxKart and contribute to those by other developers such as Tux Racer. BZFlag pre-dates all of these, inspired by Battlezone and started in 1992 and released in 1993.

The OpenGL specification provided a foundation for hardware acceleration since 1992, primarily through the free Mesa implementation since 1995, and later complimented by Vulkan since 2016. The Direct3D API has also been made available on free operating systems via compatibility layers such as WineD3D and DXKV. The Glide API was also made open source following the dissolution of 3dfx in 2002.

The Genesis3D engine project, Crystal Space and Cube also spawned other 3D free software engines and games, later joined by the likes of Irrlicht, OGRE, Retribution, Panda3D, Castle, Neutron, and Cafu. FlightGear, YSFlight, and GL-117 are also good examples, first started in 1997, 1999 and 2003 respectively (and the latter eventually forked as Linux Air Combat), especially noting that they are not first-person shooters but flight simulators; Danger from the Deep meanwhile simulates submarines. The games Yo Frankie! and Sintel The Game were developed by the Blender Foundation to showcase the abilities of the Blender modelling tool and the erstwhile Blender Game Engine.

id Software, an early entrant into commercial Linux gaming, would also prove to be an early supporter of free gaming when John Carmack released the source code for Wolfenstein 3D in 1995 and Doom in 1997, first under a custom license and then later the GNU General Public License (GPL) in 1999 (later termed id Tech 1). This was followed by the release of Quake engine in 1999, the Quake II engine in 2001 (both known as id Tech 2), id Tech 3 in 2004 and most recently id Tech 4 in 2011 (including the updated version from the Doom 3: BFG Edition in 2012) before Carmack left id in 2013.

id Tech 4 was released as free software, even amongst patent concerns from Creative Labs over Carmack's reverse, while the original Doom source release shipped without music due to complications with the Cygnus Studios developed DMX library (which lead to the Linux version being selected for release). Carmack has continued to advise developers to be careful when depending on middleware, noting how it can limit the possibilities of later releasing source code. Tim Sweeney has implied this issue has hindered potential releases of older Unreal Engine source code.

This led not only to source ports that allowed the playing of the non-free games based on these engines (plus fan added enhancements) on free engines and systems, but has also to the production of standalone free games. These include Freedoom, Blasphemer, Open Quartz, LibreQuake, Nexuiz/Xonotic, Tremulous/Unvanquished, Quetoo, and OpenArena on id Tech, plus Terminal Overload and Uebergame on the later open sourced Torque engine. Freeware games, such as Harmony, The Adventures of Square, Alien Arena, Warsow / Warfork, World of Padman, The Dark Mod, and Urban Terror, have also taken advantage of these free engines and sometimes have given code back to the community. Development and editing tools are also commonly released freely, such as GtkRadiant, Qoole, Doom Builder, LibreSprite, LDtk, Tile Studio, and Tiled. Released engines have also been used for fangames such as Sonic Robo Blast 2, Wolfenstein: Blade of Agony, and ZBlood/Transfusion, and even commercial games such as Wrath: Aeon of Ruin, Steel Storm, and DOOMBRINGER, on the DarkPlaces engine, as well as Hedon, Selaco, and Vomitoreum on the GZDoom engine and also titles by Blendo Games on the id Tech 2 and id Tech 4 engines. The games Ion Fury and A.W.O.L are built on the source available Build engine, and Excalibur: Morgana's Revenge on Aleph One.

id partners and related, such as Raven Software, Bungie and 3D Realms, as well as several of the developers who participated in the Humble Indie Bundle, have also released code and it is now accepted practice for some mainstream game developers to release legacy source code. Formerly proprietary games such as Jump 'n Bump, Dink Smallwood, Clonk, Seven Kingdoms, AstroMenace, Warzone 2100, Glitch, Maelstrom, Planet Blupi, Avara, Eat the Whistle, Blades of Exile, Star Control 2, SimCity, Fish Fillets, HoverRace, Duelyst, as well Abuse and the unfinished Golgotha have even been entirely released freely, including multimedia assets and levels. Some games are mostly free software but contain some proprietary content such as the Cube sequel, Sauerbraten (and later forks such as Red Eclipse), or the former Quake III Arena mod Smokin' Guns, but some developers desire and/or work on replacing these with free content. Released source code has even been used for commercial re-releases of vintage games such as Wolfenstein 3D Classic for iOS, Abuse Classic for iPhone, and The Original Strife: Veteran Edition.

Primarily proprietary developers have also helped free gaming by creating free libraries. Loki Software helped create and maintain the Simple DirectMedia Layer and OpenAL libraries and Linux Game Publishing created and maintained the free network layer Grapple. LGP also avoided publishing games similar to popular free titles. Many libraries/infrastructures have been created without corporate assistance however, such as the online game system GGZ Gaming Zone, Gamerzilla achievement integration, GamingAnywhere cloud streaming, Mumble voice over IP, OBS Studio for screencasting, and the Lutris game manager. Physics engines such as Box2D, Bullet, Chipmunk, OPAL, Open Dynamics Engine, Tokamak and Newton Game Dynamics have been made available as open source. In addition, various game creators are free software such as the ZZT remake MegaZeux, versions of Game Editor, Adventure Game Studio, OHRRPGCE, Game-Maker, the engine behind Stencyl, the original Construct, GDevelop and Godot

Rise in popularity and diversity

Individuals and teams have continued creating many popular free software games, starting really in the late 1990s to the present day. Many of these are clones such as Pingus, Lix, and Rabbit Escape (Lemmings), BomberClone (Atomic Bomberman), Enigma (Oxyd), Beats of Rage (Streets of Rage), TetriNET  (Tetris), GAV (Arcade Volleyball), Ace of Penguins (Microsoft Solitaire), Crack Attack (Tetris Attack), System Syzygy (Systems' Twilight), Numpty Physics (Crayon Physics), Pathological (Logcial), PainTown (MUGEN), FloboPoyo (Puyo Puyo), Paranoid, LBreakOut 2, and Briquolo (Breakout), BurgerSpace (BurgerTime), Einstein Puzzle (Sherlock), UltraStar (SingStar), OpenClonk (Clonk), FreeGish (Gish), Hexoshi (Super Metroid), I Have No Tomatoes (Dynablaster), Scorched 3D and XScorch (Scorched Earth), FreeVikings (The Lost Vikings), Savage Wheels (Destruction Derby), Penguin Command (Missile Command), Sable (Space Harrier), Circus Linux! (Circus Atari), Falling Time (Fall Down), Toppler (Tower Toppler), Gem Drop X (Gem Drop), Fish Supper and Froggix (Frogger), OpenMortal (Mortal Kombat), Triplane Turmoil and SDL Sopwth (Sopwith), Taisei Project (Touhou Project), Crown and Cutlass (Sid Meier's Pirates!), IceBreaker (JezzBall), Monsterz (Bejeweled), Tux Football and YSoccer (Sensible Soccer), iMaze (MIDI Maze), PixBros (Bubble Bobble), Surge the Rabbit (Sonic the Hedgehog), Dave Gnukem (Duke Nukem), Minetest (Minecraft), SolarWolf (Solar Fox), Tile World (Chip's Challenge),  FreeOrion (Master of Orion), Tuxánci (Bulánci), Super Tux Party (Mario Party), Neverball (Super Monkey Ball), Kraptor/RafKill (Raptor: Call of the Shadows), Trackballs (Marble Madness), Hurrican (Turrican), OpenTyrian (Tyrian), HexGL (Wipeout), Zaz (Zuma), Ostrich Riders (Joust), Endless Sky and Naev (Escape Velocity), Pioneer and Oolite (Elite), SuperTux, Secret Maryo Chronicles and Mari0 (Super Mario Bros.), WarMUX and Hedgewars (Worms), OpenLieroX, NiL, LieroLibre (Liero) as well as Frets on Fire (Guitar Hero), and StepMania (Dance Dance Revolution).

Frozen Bubble, originally a clone of Puzzle Bobble, has become a classic known for its addictive gameplay and winner of many Linux Journal Reader's Choice Awards.  These games and others have also helped expand the prevalent Tux genre which started with titles and like A Quest for Herring and are related to the activist content of games like XBill. As well as ground up clones, open source re-implementations of various proprietary games have become increasingly common, which utilize the original game data. More original games such as the platformers 0verkill, Abe's Amazing Adventure, Adventures on Planet Zephulor, Alex the Allegator 4, Amphetamine, B.A.L.L.Z., Cow's Revenge, Gilbert and the doors, Go Ollie!, Me and My Shadow, Mr. Rescue,  Nikwi, Plee the Bear, Super Bombinhas, Stringrolled, Teeworlds, Which Way Is Up,  and Worminator 3, puzzle games such as Anagramarama, Angry, Drunken, Dwarves, Balls Blocks and Mazes, Battery, Brikx, Chroma, Dynamite, Hex-a-Hop, irrlamb, kiki the nano bot, Marble Muncher, Memonix, Raincat, Tetzle, The Powder Toy, Wizznic!, and Xye,  arcade games such as Apricots, Airstrike, Avoision, Battle Tanks, C-Dogs, Chromium B.S.U., Emilia Pinball, the Enemy Lines series, Free Tennis, the Geki series, Hase, Help Hannah's Horse, Heroes, KETM, Kuklomenos, Librerama, Luola, M.A.R.S., Meat Fighter - The Weiner Warrior, Moag, osu!, Osgg, Overgod, Powermanga, Ri-li, Super Transball 2, Technoball Z, and Zorn, have been able to carve out their own niches.

A number of these games and those mentioned earlier and later in this section have even received mainstream press coverage and commercial compilations, and have helped to establish free gaming as a moderately popular pastime. Most prominently among Linux users and other free Unix-like systems such as BSD, Solaris, Darwin, and SerenityOS, but also some Macintosh players and even a few Microsoft Windows gamers. As well, open source games have been made available for Palm OS, Android, and iOS mobile devices. Additionally, these games provide options for a variety of alternative and hobbyist systems, including CP/M, OS/2, BeOS, RISC OS, QNX, IRIX, MenuetOS, AmigaOS (plus WarpOS), and MorphOS, as well as later implementations such as FreeDOS, ArcaOS, ReactOS, Haiku, KolibriOS, Syllable Desktop, AmigaOS 4, and AROS. Particularly prolific is New Breed Software, which offers games for all or most of those systems, as well as for vintage computers such as the Atari 8-bit, Atari ST, and Commodore Amiga, homebrew for several game consoles such as the Sega Dreamcast, Sony PlayStation 2 and Nintendo Wii, handhelds such as the Sony PSP, Nintendo DS and GP2X, as well as mobile platforms such as OpenZaurus, Maemo, and SymbianOS.

Strategy and simulation games have been a prevalent force in free software gaming, partly due to the lack of proprietary options for free software operating systems as compared to other genres like first-person shooters and role-playing games. Xconq and XBattle, and later Freeciv and Lincity, began the trend, and were followed by other clone titles like FreeCol, UnCiv, Crimson Fields, C-evo, LordsAWar!, Freelords, Open General, OpenPanzer, OpenCity, TripleA, Mindustry, Tanks of Freedom, OpenRA, OpenRCT2, OpenTTD, Simutrans, Advanced Strategic Command,  Tenes Empanadas Graciela, Endgame: Singularity, Thousand Parsec, Unknown Horizons and Widelands.

The Stratagus project began as an attempt to recreate the proprietary Warcraft II engine, under the name FreeCraft. Blizzard Entertainment sent a cease and desist letter in 2003 over the use of the name "craft" in comparison to Warcraft and StarCraft. Though the earlier free software strategy game CRAFT: The Vicious Vikings shared the name "craft" without controversy. With the new, legally inoffensive name Stratagus and the old FreeCraft assets renamed Aleona's Tales, the team began work on a new strategy game called Bos Wars.

Development on this game still continues, as well as the modern Warcraft II port Wargus. Other games branched out of the engine project as well such as the Battle for Mandicor and Astroseries projects, the StarCraft port attempt Stargus, and most recently Wyrmsun. After the Stratagus example, other real-time strategy games were developed, such as Globulation 2, which experiments with game management mechanics, the similarly experimental Liquid War, the claymation based Dark Oberon, and the 3D projects 0 A.D. (a former freeware project), Boson, Battles of Antargis, Spring and Glest. 

Racing games, another uncommon Linux commercial genre, have also seen development. One of the earliest was RARS, which evolved following the principle of forking into TORCS and then Speed Dreams. MicroRacers and Toy Cars are inspired by Micro Machines, while Ultimate Stunts and Stunt Rally, are rooted in Stunts. Other racing games include versions of Racer, VDrift, Rigs of Rods, Slune, GLtron and Armagetron Advanced, YORG, the Mario Kart–inspired SuperTuxKart, Elasto Mania clone X-Moto, SkyRoads imitator Orbit-Hopper, sledding game Extreme Tux Racer, the text based ZRacer, and the top-down Trophy, Dust Racing 2D and Pixel Wheels.

WorldForge, Ryzom, Crossfire, Solipsis, Illarion, and The Mana World are further examples of increasing diversification, offering free massively multiplayer online role-playing game worlds. Single-player role-playing games are also available, such as A Dark Room, Heroes of Allacrost, Valyria Tear, Empty Clip, Summoning Wars, GNU FreeDink, FLARE, Heroine Dusk, FreedroidRPG, the Cube World inspired Veloren, and the Pokémon derived Tuxemon, OPMon, and Pigeon Ascent.

The rise of the independent game development in the 2000s and 2010s was partly driven by the growing ecosystem of open-source libraries and engines; indie developers utilized the open-source ecosystem due to good cross-platform capabilities and availability for limited financial burden. Game jams such as Ludum Dare and Game Off are often run on open source principles, frequently using free frameworks such as pygame, LibGDX, Twine, Phaser, Cocos2d, Ren'Py and LÖVE. Educational languages such as Snap! and Scratch are also free software. Individual developers such as Jason Rohrer, creator of Passage and One Hour One Life, and Kenta Cho have embraced open source.

Greater organization

Despite its initial roots as small private projects, the free software gaming scene has been becoming progressively more organized. The roots of this even go back as far as the games created for the GNU Project and to the original larger-scale free software projects like Freeciv. Still, for the most part free game development had very little organization throughout its history. Popular games were generally separate efforts, except for instances of people working on them known for other projects such as Ingo Ruhnke (Pingus), Bill Kendrick (SuperTux) and Steve Baker (TuxKart). Games were commonly found in directories such as The Linux Game Tome and Freshmeat and hosted on sites like SourceForge and GNU Savannah, but they were largely only ever brought together in the form of disorganized lists. Other projects and games existed purely on small isolated personal or project websites, often unknown and ignored.

The launch of the GNOME and KDE desktop projects in the late 1990s organized application and, to a certain extent, game development. Both attempts to create a more usable Linux desktop attracted volunteers to make utilities to that end. These programs included games, mostly recreations of small games like Minesweeper or Solitaire that come with Microsoft Windows, arcade classics and the like, games from combined sets such as Microsoft Entertainment Pack, and occasionally original ideas.

The variety and amount of these games, and other free games easily found in software repositories, have had GNOME or KDE-enabled Linux called a better option for out of the box casual gaming than Microsoft Windows. Many such games are packaged into kdegames and the erstwhile GNOME Games package. Examples include GNOME Aisleriot, GNOME Quadrapassel, GNOME Tetravex, GNOME Mines, GNOME Robots, GNOME Nibbles, and KTuberling, KMahjongg, KGoldrunner, KBreakout, KsirK, plus the original game Konquest. Although designed primarily for application development, the underlying GTK and Qt toolkits have also been used broadly for game development, as have wxWidgets, Tk and FLTK. The availability of free game engines, such as Stratagus, Pygame, Sauerbraten and ioquake3 have also helped unify free software development by making the engine projects themselves hubs of activity for games that make use of them.

The Battle for Wesnoth project was started in 2003 and quickly became popular to both players and editors. It also showcased some new ideas when it came to free game development. Like Freeciv before it, it utilized the efforts of the gaming and free software community and their code, levels and artwork contributions but it also accepted storyline contributions and ideas for the game's entire fictional universe. The game's canon is maintained through review and discussion over which submitted campaigns become official, thus setting up a model for community input and organized results. This helped the game grow in scale and popularity to the point of being almost saga-like in scope. In addition, the project is worked on by many well-known free programmers, artists, designers and musicians such as the co-founder of the Open Source Initiative Eric S. Raymond, and Linux kernel hacker Rusty Russell.Vega Strike has similarly allowed its community to expand the game and the surrounding lore while maintaining canon consistency. The Wesnoth developers also worked on Frogatto & Friends, which features a free engine but mostly proprietary game data.

Hubs and development teams 

The general lack of unity and organization has created and continues to generate some controversy among the free software community, with problems of "reinventing the wheel" by making similar clones, games and multimedia resources being cited as a notable problem to free game development. This is especially taking up more notice as other problems are corrected, such as a lack of tools, libraries, artists and coders. A more central knowledge bank, texture library, and discussion area had been lacking.

Traditionally free software video games were developed as individual projects, some small scale and others larger scale. Programmers and other developers did often work on other projects, but the whole system was very unlinked. More recently free software development teams have started appearing, groups that function like software companies and create multiple pieces of work. Examples include the developer Parallel Realities, which have released the games Project: Starfighter, The Legend of Edgar, Blob Wars: Metal Blob Solid, as well as its sequel, Blob Wars: Blob and Conquer.

The Linux Game Tome "Game of the Month" team was an open group of game developers that revamp old free software games. Some examples include the transformation of TuxKart into the more modern SuperTuxKart, work on Pingus and SuperTux, and Lincity-NG, an updated version of Lincity with superior graphics. A more recent project with similar goals exists called LibreGames, which has worked on Jump 'n Bump, OpenAlchemist and FreeTumble and JAG.

PlayPower is a non-profit organization founded in 2008 designed to create free educational computer software for low income families in India and other developing countries. The Tux4Kids initiative also maintains various educational games featuring the child-freindly Tux character such as Tux Paint, Tux, of Math Command, Tux Typing and related efforts. The GCompris suite is also available from KDE, and the activity centre Childsplay is also available.

In recent years, content repositories such as OpenGameArt.org, Wikimedia Commons, Openclipart, and The Freesound Project have enabled developers to easily find appropriately-licensed content rather than relying on programmer art. Such content is often under Creative Commons licenses or those in the GNU GPL family, easily facilitating use by most free software projects. OpenGameArt.org is also affiliated with related websites such as Libregamewiki, a database of purely libre games, the Free Gamer blog and the FreeGameDev forums.

GitHub, GitLab and Gitea now hosts a significant amount of free and open-source games. 
The itch.io service is also a host for many open source games, and also features an open source client. The same is true for competitor Game Jolt, and was also the case for former distributor Desura. A number of open source games have even been made available on Steam. Many free software games are also available from Flathub and Snap.

See also

 List of open-source video games
 List of commercial video games with available source code
 List of freeware video games

References

External links 
 
 SourceForge Games List of games hosted by SourceForge (archived on 27 May 2015)
 Playing the Open Source Game, a 1999 article by Shawn Hargreaves (archived on 10 October 2011)
 LibreGameWiki
 Open source games list on GitHub
 Open source game clones list
 Game category of the Free software directory

Video game development